Garth Tander (born 31 March 1977) is a multiple-championship winning Australian motor racing driver competing in the Virgin Australia Supercars Championship's Enduro Cup, co-driving the No. 97 Holden ZB Commodore for Triple Eight Race Engineering. He was the 2007 series champion for the HSV Dealer Team and is a five-time winner in Australia's most prestigious motor race, the Bathurst 1000.

Tander also owns a motor racing team TanderSport.

Early career
As a child, Tander started racing go karts at Tiger Kart Club in WA, and by the time he was 17 years old, he had won 7 state titles and one Australian title.

Tander was Australian Formula Ford champion in 1997.

After failing to find a budget to run in Formula Holden in 1998, Tander was offered the seat in one of Garry Rogers Motorsport's V8 Supercars.

Professional career

Garry Rogers Motorsport
Tander finished second in the 2000 championship taking the championship to the last round where he was beaten by now five-time championship winner Mark Skaife. After winning the famous Bathurst 1000 race in 2000 with Jason Bargwanna, he found limited success.

Tander was the winner of the first Bathurst 24hr race driving a modified Holden Monaro 427C running a 7.0L (427cui) motor rather than the 5.7L Gen III that the road car runs. He co-drove this race with Steven Richards, Cameron McConville and Nathan Pretty while driving for V8 Supercar team boss Garry Rogers Motorsport. Tander was widely tipped to drive the Monaro for GRM in the Australian Nations Cup Championship in 2003 but concentrated instead on V8 Supercars with the drive going to Nathan Pretty. In the 2003 Bathurst 24 Hour Tander, again driving the very same Monaro from 2002 with the same co-drivers in the same team, came second to the team's second Monaro driven by Peter Brock, Greg Murphy, Jason Bright and Todd Kelly. Driving at the end, Tander finished only 0.2 seconds behind Greg Murphy with Tander setting the race's fastest lap on lap 526, the second last of the race. The GRM Monaro's led the race throughout and finished 13 laps ahead of the third place Porsche 911 GT3 RC.

In 2004 Tander remained at Garry Rogers Motorsport but it was announced in the early part of the season that he would not be returning to the team in 2005. His season started poorly at Adelaide with a DNF in Race 1 and he was unable to even start Race 2. The rest of the year improved slightly for Garth with his stand out results being 4th overall for the Round at Barbagallo and Sandown. He ended the year 11th in the Championship. In November 2004 it was announced that Garth would move to the HSV Dealer Team on a 3-year deal starting in 2005.

HSV Dealer Team
In 2005 he moved to a newly renamed team, the HSV Dealer Team (formerly K-Mart Racing Team) partnered with dual Bathurst winner Rick Kelly.

Tander was leading the V8 Supercar championship in 2006 after six rounds, but a disastrous round in Oran Park lost him the championship lead. The endurance races following were no better. Tander participated in a highly controversial driver swap with the Holden Racing Team which involved Todd Kelly coming to the HSV Dealer Team. Garth and co-driver Mark Skaife dominated the entire Sandown round until a broken steering problem destroyed the almost certain victory. At the next round at Bathurst, the car's clutch failed off the line and was hit from the rear by another car before the second turn on lap one. After a crushing end to his Bathurst 1000 campaign, Tander was visibly upset, probably realising that his run at the V8 Supercar title was all but over. The car had been near on fastest in every practice and qualifying session prior to the race on the Sunday.

For the second year in a row Tander won the Symmons Plains round, winning two of the three races, even with engine troubles resulting in the car running on seven cylinders. During race one, someone rear-ended him from first to finish fourth with a few laps to go.

Tander raced the #16 Toll HSV Commodore in 2007, and won the second round (held at Barbagallo Raceway in his home state of Western Australia), winning all three 50-lap races. He also repeated this at Queensland Raceway. This saw him take the points lead from his teammate Rick Kelly. Late in the season, Tander had a disappointment at Bathurst where brake issues forced his retirement, but at Surfers Paradise and Bahrain he scored solid points to take the lead in the championship back off Jamie Whincup. At the penultimate Symmons Plains round in Tasmania, Tander won the first race, before a slow pitstop in the second race dropped him to tenth. A clash with Steven Richards over second position broke his steering column, ending the third race prematurely.

Tander claimed the 2007 V8 Supercars Championship, just two points ahead of Jamie Whincup with Craig Lowndes in third, and defending champ Rick Kelly in fourth. All four were in contention for the title in the Grand Finale. His round win at Philip Island also saw Holden secure the manufacturers title, and Toll HSV Dealer Team took the teams championship.

Holden Racing Team
In 2008 Tander moved to Holden Racing Team after three years at the HSV Dealer Team. Tander had a bad start to the season with a DNF in both races at the Clipsal 500, His first round win of 2008 came in New Zealand at the Hamilton 400, his second round win came at Winton in July, Tander and his teammate Mark Skaife won the first enduro at the L & H 500 at Philip Island and Tander was looking strong at the Supercheap Auto Bathurst 1000 but a slipping clutch spoilt a pole position start. 100 laps later his co-driver Mark Skaife crashed lightly into the wall coming up to Forrests Elbow, ending their chances of a win.

Tander came third in the 2008 V8 Supercars Championship season behind Mark Winterbottom and series champion Jamie Whincup. Tander won the Bathurst 1000 twice in 2009 with Will Davison and in 2011 with Nick Percat.

In 2013, with the introduction of the Car of the Future, Holden Racing Team (along with all other teams competing with Holdens) changed over to the newer VF Commodore. This season gave Tander limited and inconsistent success. He managed to clock up 5 podium finishes, including a win at both Townsville and Phillip Island. He finished the 2013 Championship in 8th place. In 2015, Tander won the Enduro Cup driving with Warren Luff, despite not winning any of the endurance races.

In 2016, Tander has slammed Jamie Whincup's "pretty desperate" move that triggered a disastrous chain-reaction, sending the Holden Racing Team driver crashing into the wall and ending his 2016 hopes. Whincup was hit with a 15-second penalty for the driving infringement, while Volvo driver Scott McLaughlin was to face post-race investigation for dangerous re-entry. Tander, who was fourth and in pursuit of his second enduro win after his stunning victory at Sandown, said immediately after the incident he blamed Whincup for starting the chain reaction.

Triple Eight Race Engineering
Garth rejoined GRM at the start of the 2017 season. He spent two years with GRM but was unexpectedly dumped by the team just before the start of the 2019 season. Without a full-time drive he was signed by Triple Eight Race Engineering to be a co-driver for the endurance races.

Personal life

Tander was married to his ex-wife Leanne from 2004 to 2022. Tander is father to two children, Scarlet and Sebastian.

Career results

Supercars Championship results

Bathurst 1000 results

Complete Bathurst 24 Hour results

Complete Bathurst 12 Hour results

TCR Australia results

References

External links
Garth Tander - Official website
Garth Tander - V8 Supercars Official Profile
Driver Database profile
Profile on Racing Reference
Tander takes fans on a virtual tour around Mt Panorama
Client page of Tander's management company, DSEG

1977 births
Living people
Supercars Championship drivers
Racing drivers from Perth, Western Australia
Bathurst 1000 winners
Formula Ford drivers
Australian Touring Car Championship drivers
Australian Endurance Championship drivers
Garry Rogers Motorsport drivers
Audi Sport drivers